Garry Lariviere (born December 6, 1954) is a Canadian former ice hockey defenceman.

Born in St. Catharines, Ontario, Lariviere was drafted by the Buffalo Sabres in the fifth round of the 1974 NHL amateur draft but opted to play in the rival World Hockey Association instead. He began his professional career with the Phoenix Roadrunners in 1974, was traded to the Quebec Nordiques in 1977 and was one of the players the Nordiques retained when the Nordiques merged into the National Hockey League in 1979. He also played for the Edmonton Oilers. He left the NHL after the 1983 season. He played 3 more years in the AHL for the St. Catharines Saints before retiring as a player.

Coaching career
 He was an assistant coach for the St. Catharines Saints in 1985, and 1986.
 He was an assistant coach for the Toronto Maple Leafs from 1987 - 1990.

Career statistics

External links

1954 births
Living people
Buffalo Sabres draft picks
Canadian ice hockey defencemen
Chicago Cougars draft picks
Edmonton Oilers players
Franco-Ontarian people
Sportspeople from St. Catharines
St. Catharines Black Hawks players
Phoenix Roadrunners (WHA) players
Quebec Nordiques players
Quebec Nordiques (WHA) players
Toronto Maple Leafs coaches
Ice hockey people from Ontario
Canadian expatriate ice hockey players in the United States
Canadian ice hockey coaches